Unione Sportiva Massese 1919 is an Italian football club, based in Massa, Tuscany. Massese currently plays in Serie E, having last been in Serie B in 1970–71 season.

History 
The first club in Massa was founded in 1919 as Società Sportiva Juventus Massa with green colors.

The black and white Massese dates back to the end of World War II in 1945. In the summer of 1991 it was renamed Unione Sportiva Massese 1919, but in 2009 it went bankrupt and it was reformed under the current name.

In the season 2011–12 the team was promoted from Eccellenza Tuscany/A to Serie D after playoffs.

Colors and badge 
The team's colors are black and white.

Notable former players
 Claudio Vinazzani
 Giorgio Chinaglia
 Roberto Mussi
 Giancarlo Oddi
 Gianluca Pessotto
 Giacomo Lorenzini

External links
Official site

Football clubs in Tuscany
Massa
Association football clubs established in 1919
Serie B clubs
Serie C clubs
Serie D clubs
1919 establishments in Italy
1945 establishments in Italy